Youth for Human Rights International (YHRI) is an American non-profit organization. Founded and largely staffed and financed by Scientologists, its stated mission is "To teach youth around the globe about human rights, thus helping them to become valuable advocates for the promotion of tolerance and peace."

The organization promotes Scientology founder L. Ron Hubbard's writings on human rights and the United Nations Universal Declaration of Human Rights, by sponsoring essay and art contests and by providing materials for students and teaching guides for schools.

According to the Church of Scientology International, Scientologist Mary Shuttleworth founded the organization in August 2001 "in coordination with the Church of Scientology International's Human Rights Office". Scientology's website states that by 2004 it had established activities in more than 26 countries, including Mexico, the United States and Sweden.

Leadership
YHRI's president and founder is Mary Shuttleworth (formerly Mary Untiedt), former president of YHRI's parent organization International Foundation for Human Rights and Tolerance. She also founded the Applied Scholastics schools "Shuttleworth Academy" and "Mary's Schoolhouse." Shuttleworth holds an executive position at TXL Films, the company that created the music video UNITED with YHRI.  She is a Scientologist.

According to the newsletter Church of Scientology International, the executive director of YHRI is Tim Bowles, former law partner of Bowles & Moxon, serving as general legal council for the Church of Scientology. Bowles also acts as an advisor to Scientology's Citizens Commission on Human Rights.

Lynsey Bartilson, who appears on the television series Grounded for Life, is a prominent YHRI spokesperson. She was raised and remains a Scientologist, and her mother Laurie Bartilson was a former law partner at Moxon & Bartilson. In her online biography, she states that she worked as creative director and choreographer for the Scientology Celebrity Center's “Kids on Stage for A Better World.”

Programs
YHRI has teamed with TXL Films (founded by Taron Lexton, son of YHRI founder Mary Shuttleworth) to create the award-winning music video, "UNITED." In June 2006, they released 30 public service announcements for TV, illustrating each of the 30 rights in the Universal Declaration of Human Rights., which were created by the Human Rights Department of the Church of Scientology International for YHRI.

Activities and events
YHRI distributes materials related to its interpretation of the United Nations Universal Declaration of Human Rights and YHRI programs, to schoolchildren in a variety of developed nations, such as the United States, Australia, the United Kingdom and the Czech Republic. YHRI is also active in Germany. In Belgium, it handed out a prize, and also held an awards ceremony in Bulgaria for the same prize. YHRI awarded one prize to a Chinese actress, who promoted the group's views on her web site, and another to a young Israeli Scientologist who screened the film, UNITED, and distributed YHRI materials in his school. It held a conference in Zurich. It discussed plans to lecture and distribute its materials to schoolchildren in Ghana and Liberia. It advocated lower school fees in Uganda, and held a peace rally in Nigeria. In South Africa, Mary Shuttleworth's country of origin, it is pushing for a "human rights month." The organization's work is supported by the actor and Scientologist Tom Cruise and cooperates with human rights organizations, such as, allegedly, local chapters of Amnesty International. According to the Frankfurter Allgemeine Zeitung, neither Amnesty in Berlin nor Amnesty International headquarters in London had knowledge of any such collaboration and Amnesty International, as of March 2013, has been removed from the list of collaborators on the YHRI website.

In 2005, Youth for Human Rights International organized a conference at a Los Angeles High School. Stephen Strachan, principal of Jordan High School, said that although he knew some of the organizers were Scientologists, he did not know of YHRI's relationship to the church until the Church of Scientology was listed on publicity materials as a co-sponsor. After learning of the connection, an agreement was negotiated to remove any mention of the Church of Scientology from literature, and letters were sent to parents saying students would need permission to attend the event.

In 2007, YHRI led a pilot human rights course in the province of KwaZulu-Natal, South Africa, at which it distributed L. Ron Hubbard's tract The Way to Happiness to students ranging from 12 to 17 years old, and taught them Scientology jargon like the tone scale, while trying to enroll them in Drug Free Marshalls, a Scientology organization like Narconon. An official in the provincial government said he hoped to bring it to the province's 4.44 million children.

Criticism
In 2007, at a human rights youth forum organized by YHRI, in Sydney, Australia, three students from Canterbury Girls High School expressed concern at overt references to Scientology in the promotional materials. One said she felt "exploited." The Department of Education is looking into the students' complaints. However, David Clarke, a Liberal of the New South Wales upper house and a member of the Catholic group Opus Dei, said that he had also been unaware of any strong links between the youth forum and the Church of Scientology. But, Clarke added, "I'm a practising Catholic. There was no pushing as far as I could see of Scientology."

A German journalist has accused Scientology of false advertising through YHRI, recruiting members indirectly, and government officials in Germany have said YHRI serves as a cover-up tactic for Scientology.

The Florida Holocaust Museum complained that YHRI's connection to Scientology was not disclosed when they worked with them to organize a human rights march in St. Petersburg, Florida in March 2007.

In each of the above cases the YHRI organizer responded that, while the Church of Scientology supported their group, it was a YHRI event, not a Church event and the message was human rights, not Scientology. However, the Herald reported that, on the materials handed out at the event in Australia, L.Ron Hubbard's image and quotes figured more prominently than those of such activists as Martin Luther King and Mahatma Gandhi.

Ursula Caberta, the Commissioner for the Scientology Task Force of the Hamburg Interior Authority, a Scientology watchdog group, stated the YHRI is one of a number of Scientology-linked groups that mask their connection to the church and seek to attract and recruit the young.

In 1995, the Hamburg Senate released a report on Scientology, describing its structure and the dangers it presented to individuals and society.  One passage, citing Scientology documents, clarified the role of all organizations, which, like YHRI, are linked to the church.

"In an internal memo, Scientology described the function of affiliate organizations:

'All organizations and groups form a global network.  Each one has its own individual role and responsibilities.  But all service organizations have the goal to draw attention to L.Ron Hubbard's technology and deliver it to the public.'

Thus, each activity, however distantly it is related to Scientology, fits into a long-term strategic plan, which is ultimately steered by the highest management."

Scientology, YHRI And Human Rights in Europe
According to the official Scientology website, YHRI is part of its overall campaign. YHRI, known in German as "Jugend für Menschenrechte," is active in both Switzerland and Germany, organizing human rights conferences for youth to promote religious tolerance. Referring to the campaign, Antje Blumenthal, a member of the German parliament, expressed concern that the good intentions of the young were being misused.

The governments of France
and Germany
have investigated Scientology in regard to human rights violations, investigations the Scientology organization calls discriminatory. It has responded with an opposing campaign through the Church of Scientology International European Office for Public Affairs and Human Rights, using public service announcements issued by YHRI, and created by the Human Rights Department of the Church of Scientology International.

See also
 Village Suisse ONG

References

External links
 Youth For Human Rights International
 deinemenschenrechte.de, homepage of United for Human Rights, Deutschland
 unidosporlosderechoshumanos.mx, homepage of Unidos por los Derechos Humanos, spanisch

Non-profit organizations based in Los Angeles
Scientology organizations